Narfi fra Hrisey was an ice hockey team in Hrísey, Iceland, founded in 1964. The team played in the Icelandic Men's Hockey League in the 2005, 2006, and 2008 seasons. They did not win a game in the 2007–08 season, and finished in fourth place in all three of their seasons.

Season-by-season record

References

External links
Team profile on Eurohockey.net

Ice hockey teams in Iceland
Ice hockey clubs established in 1964
1964 establishments in Iceland
Icelandic Hockey League
2008 disestablishments in Iceland
Ice hockey clubs disestablished in 2008